Jing-Pha Tsai (also Jeffrey J. P. Tsai) is a computer scientist and the current president of Asia University (Taiwan) in Taiwan.

Career
He received his PhD degree in computer science from Northwestern University, and taught in the Department of Electrical Engineering and Computer Science at University of Illinois at Chicago from 1985 to 2010. He is an elected Fellow of the American Association for the Advancement of Science, the Institute for Electrical and Electronic Engineers, the Society for Design and Process Science(SDPS), and a Distinguished Fellow of the  International Engineering and Technology Institute.

He is currently the Co-Editor-in-Chief of the International Journal on Artificial Intelligence Tools

Awards and honors
University Scholar Award from the University of Illinois Foundation
IEEE Technical Achievement Award
IEEE Meritorious Service Award

References

External links

Living people
Computer scientists
Fellow Members of the IEEE
Year of birth missing (living people)